Kauravar is a 1992 Indian Malayalam-language gangster action thriller film, directed by Joshiy, written by Lohithadas, starring Mammootty, Vishnuvardhan, Thilakan, Murali, Anju, Babu Antony and Bheeman Raghu. The film was remade in Telugu as Khaidi Garu, with Mohan Babu. It was also remade into Kannada in 2001 by the title Devasura, starring Devraj and B. C. Patil.

The musical score and songs were composed by S. P. Venkatesh.

Plot
A gang led by Aliyar holds a grudge against Police Officer Haridas, who was responsible for the death of Antony's wife and daughter as well as Aliyar's wife and two daughters 12 years ago and sent Antony to jail. When Antony is finally freed, he reunites with his old gang and they plan to kill Haridas. In a fight between Antony and his gang with Haridas, They manages to defeat him. Haridas tries to shoot Antony and his gang but he get stabbed by Aliyar. Haridas tells Antony that his daughter who he thought had died is actually still alive and was raised by him as one of his daughters. Aliyar and gang are not allowing him to see his daughter as he might be lying. Antony pleads to the gang to leave Haridas alone to find his daughter but fails to stop them. Antony admits Haridas in a hospital where he sees his long-lost daughter with Haridas's daughters. He asks Haridas who is his original daughter but he didn't tell him. Haridas dies in the hospital but before dying he tells Antony to adopt care of his daughters as Antony's daughter. At first, the three girls didn't like Antony but slowly they starts seeing him as their father. Aliyar and gang were planning to kill Haridas's daughters. Antony fights with his gang and tries to convince Aliyar to not kill his daughter. Aliyar tells him that he needs to kill only Haridas's daughters but Antony tells that the three girls are his daughters. Antony gets shot by Aliyar and in his defence kills Aliyar. Aliyar dies in Antony's arms.

In the climax of the movie, when Rajagopal, who was a friend of Haridas, is about to tell who is the actual daughter of Antony, he stops him saying that all the three girls are his daughters.

Cast

Release
The film was released on 12 February 1992. It was dubbed into Tamil as Kshatriyavamsham and Telugu as Kankanam.

Box office
The film was both commercial and critical success.

Soundtrack
The film's soundtrack was composed by S. P. Venkatesh. Lyrics were penned by Kaithapram.

References

External links
 

1992 films
1990s Malayalam-language films
1990s action films
Malayalam films remade in other languages
Films with screenplays by A. K. Lohithadas
Films scored by S. P. Venkatesh
Indian crime drama films
Indian gangster films
Films about organised crime in India
Fictional portrayals of the Kerala Police
Films directed by Joshiy